African United Club (AUC) are an all-star association football club in Nepal composed of the best African talent in the country. Mainly from the top flight clubs. However, due to the lack of a professional African goalkeeper in Nepal, a Nepalese goalkeeper is used. AUC currently hold the title of 2014 Udayapur Gold Cup winners. The current captain is Victor Amobi.

History

Squad

Statistics

See also
Football in Nepal

External links
Three Star Club vs African United Club (2012 Budha Subba Gold Cup)

References

Football clubs in Nepal